The Metal Production and Manufacturing Workers' Union was a trade union representing workers in the metal industry in Yugoslavia.

The union was founded in 1974, when the Union of Industrial and Mining Workers was split up.  Like its predecessor, it affiliated to the Confederation of Trade Unions of Yugoslavia.  By 1990, it had grown to 980,000 members and was led by Slavko Uršič.  That year, it split into various more localised unions, including the Independent Trade Union of Croatian Metal Production and Processing Workers.

References

Metal trade unions
Trade unions established in 1974
Trade unions disestablished in 1990
Trade unions in Yugoslavia